"Lie Again" is a song by American singer-songwriter Giveon. It was released through Epic Records on April 29, 2022, and serves as the second single for his debut studio album Give or Take. The song was written and produced by Giveon and Don Mills. Giveon announced the song on April 19, 2022, exactly ten days before its release.

Background
"Lie Again" comes after Giveon's ex-girlfriend, fellow American singer Justine Skye, announced and released her single, "What a Lie", which seemingly takes shots at Giveon for reportedly texting other women. On "What a Lie", Skye sings: "User, what a user / A blessing, learning lessons / I see then for entertaining leeches / My poison was your peaches". In the music video, she takes a bite of a peach and spits it out on the last line, which is a likely reference to Justin Bieber's 2021 number-one single, "Peaches", in which Giveon was featured alongside Daniel Caesar on. Skye described the song as a "weak ass song", while replying to a fan's tweet. About the song, Giveon said: "'Lie Again' is a story about the internal war with oneself, battling the acceptance of the ugly-truth, and the refusal to embrace the ghosts of your lover's past. Detailing the complexities of overlooking red flags to remain blissfully ignorant in the name of love".

Composition and lyrics
"Lie Again" sees Giveon in denial, in which he cannot accept that a relationship is failed. However, he asks his lover to hide the truth as it would hurt and he would not want to deal with heartbreak. He uses his baritone voice, singing: "So lie, lie again / No one has had you like I did / I don't need the truth, baby".

Music video
The official music video for "Lie Again", directed by Adrian Martinez, premiered alongside the song on April 29, 2022. Giveon walks down the streets of downtown Los Angeles, California, as he sees a couple kissing on the street. At the end of the video, an unreleased song is previewed.

Credits and personnel
 Giveon – vocals, songwriting, production
 Don Mills – production, songwriting
 Peter Lee Johnson – violin
 Brian Cruz – engineering, recording
 Rodrigo Barahona – engineering, recording
 John Kercy – mixing
 Colin Leonard – mastering

Charts

Release history

References

2022 singles
2022 songs
Giveon songs
Songs written by Giveon